Atta vollenweideri, common name chaco leafcutter ant, is a species of leafcutter ant, a New World ant of the subfamily Myrmicinae of the genus Atta. This species is from one of the two genera of advanced attines (fungus-growing ants) within the tribe Attini.

Colonies are made up of around 4-7 million individuals.

See also
List of leafcutter ants

References

External links

 Images of winged specimens
 Study: The thermo-sensitive sensilla coeloconica of Atta vollenweideri
 Study: Wind-induced ventilation of the giant nests of Atta vollenweideri

Atta (genus)
Insects described in 1893
Taxa named by Auguste Forel